Marko Rajić (born 30 July 1991) is a Serbian football forward who plays for OFK Žarkovo.

References

External links
 
 Marko Rajić stats at footballdatabase.eu

1991 births
Living people
Sportspeople from Pula
Association football forwards
Serbian footballers
FK Čukarički players
FK Sopot players
OFK Mladenovac players
FK Teleoptik players
FK Sinđelić Beograd players
Serbian expatriate footballers
Serbian expatriate sportspeople in Hungary
Expatriate footballers in Hungary
Budapest Honvéd FC II players
Serbian expatriate sportspeople in Malta
Expatriate footballers in Malta
Hibernians F.C. players
FK Bežanija players
OFK Žarkovo players
Serbian First League players
Serbian SuperLiga players
Serbs of Croatia